Okanagan Advertiser is a newspaper in Armstrong, British Columbia, published weekly on Thursday. The paper has a circulation of 4000 and founded in 1902. It serves the Armstrong, Enderby and Spallumcheen area.

See also
List of newspapers in Canada

References

Publications established in 1902
1902 establishments in Canada
Weekly newspapers published in British Columbia